Tsuen King Circuit is an area and a road in Tsuen Wan, New Territories, Hong Kong. It is located on a hill in the northwest of the Chai Wan Kok Industrial Area, so it was also called "West Chai Wan Kok". There are mainly private housing estates in this area.

Private housing estates 
Allway Gardens
Tsuen Wan Centre
Tsuen King Garden
Joyful Building
Sheeny Terrace
Tsuen Tak Gardens
Kam Fung Terrace
Discovery Park
Summit Terrace

Facilities 
Hong Kong Adventist Hospital – Tsuen Wan
Church Of The Annunciation
Wu Chung Public Swimming Pool
Tsuen King Circuit Sports Centre

References 

Tsuen Wan
Restricted areas of Hong Kong red public minibus